Piotr Bujnowicz is a Polish-born, Golden Trailer awarded producer, and photographer.

"Golden Duck" awarded producer and photographer, National Film School in Lodz graduate. Produced promotional materials, cinema trailers and television commercials for such partners as Monolith Films, Warner Bros. and HBO, to name a few. Author of visuals and still photography of the vast majority of latest big budget Polish films. Producer and Co-author of promotional campaigns for feature films by Andrzej Wajda, Krzysztof Zanussi, Juliusz Machulski, Jan Jakub Kolski, Agnieszka Holland, Jerzy Kawalerowicz, Wojciech Marczewski and Peter Greenaway. Owner of Fabryka Obrazu film promotion agency. In 2009, together with Szymon Lenkowski he formed Trailer and More, and started creating cinema movie trailers. In 2010 nominated for Golden Trailer Awards, for General Nil trailer. In 2011 his Little Rose trailer won the Golden Trailer Awards. National Film School in Łódź graduate.

Awards 
 2011 – Golden Trailer Awards – Best Foreign Romantic trailer for Little Rose (aka. Różyczka) trailer Szymon Lenkowski, Piotr Bujnowicz – Winner
 2010 – Golden Trailer Awards – Best Foreign trailer for General Nil, Szymon Lenkowski, Piotr Bujnowicz – Nomination
 2001 – Golden Duck – Award granted by Film critics in Poland, for Introducing New Values in the field of Photography Film

Selected filmography

Trailers and more 
 2012 – Walesa. Man of Hope dir. Andrzej Wajda – producer
 2011 – In Treatment (aka. Bez tajemnic) HBO Poland TV Series, dir. Anna Kazejak-Dawid, Jacek Borcuch – producer
 2010 – Little Rose (aka. Rosebud, aka. Różyczka) feature film, dir. Jan Kidawa Błoński – producer
 2010 – General Nil feature film, dir. Ryszard Bugajski – producer
 2010 – (Kołysanka) dir. Juliusz Machulski – producer
 2009 – (Janosik. Prawdziwa historia) dir. Kasia Adamik, Agnieszka Holland – producer
 2009 – (Galerianki) dir. Katarzyna Rosłaniec – producer
 2009 – (Ostatnia akcja) dir. Michał Rogalski – producer
 2008 – (Ile waży koń trojański?) dir. Juliusz Machulski – producer
 2008 – (Rozmowy nocą) dir. Maciej Żak – producer
 2007 – Katyń dir. Andrzej Wajda – producer
 2007 – (Wino truskawkowe) dir. Dariusz Jabłoński – producer

Feature films, TV series 

  2011 (Och Karol 2)– still photographer, promotional visuals
  2009 (Janosik. Prawdziwa historia) – still photographer, promotional visuals
  2009 (Janosik. Prawdziwa historia (serial telewizyjny))- still photographer, promotional visuals
  2009 (Świnki) 2009 – still photographer, promotional visuals
  2009 (Tatarak) 2009 -still photographer, promotional visuals
  2007 – 2012 (Barwy szczęścia (TV series)) – still photographer, promotional visuals
  2007 Katyń – still photographer, promotional visuals;  The Best Foreign Feature Film, Academy Award-nominated feature
  2007 Nightwatching – still photographer, promotional visuals
  2007 (Regina (TV series)) – still photographer, promotional visuals
  2007 (Ryś) – still photographer, promotional visuals
  2007 (Świadek koronny) – still photographer, promotional visuals
  2007 (Wino truskawkowe) – still photographer, promotional visuals
  2006 (Francuski numer) – still photographer, promotional visuals
  2006 Jasminum – still photographer, promotional visuals
  2005 (Codzienna 2 m. 3 TV series) – still photographer, promotional visuals
  2005 (Komornik) – still photographer, promotional visuals
  2005 – 2007 (Magda M.)  – still photographer, promotional visuals
  2005 (Persona non grata) – still photographer, promotional visuals
  2005 (Solidarność, Solidarność... ) – still photographer, promotional visuals
  2004 (Cud w Krakowie)  – still photographer, promotional visuals
  2004 (Nigdy w życiu!) - still photographer, promotional visuals
  2004 (Officer (TV series)) - still photographer, promotional visuals
  2004 (Out of reach) - still photographer, promotional visuals
  2004 The Aryan Couple - still photographer, promotional visuals
  2003–2008 (Glina (TV series))  – still photographer, promotional visuals
  2002 (Pornografia) – still photographer, promotional visuals
  2002 (Haker)- still photographer, promotional visuals
  2002 (Przedwiośnie)- still photographer, promotional visuals
  2002 (Quo vadis) (TV series)  – still photographer, promotional visuals
  2002 (Supplement)- still photographer, promotional visuals
  2002 (Zemsta)  – still photographer, promotional visuals
  2001 (Przedwiośnie)  – still photographer, promotional visuals
  2001 Quo vadis – still photographer, promotional visuals
  2001 (Stacja)  – still photographer, promotional visuals
  2000 (Weiser) – still photographer, promotional visuals
  1999 Pan Tadeusz – still photographer, promotional visuals
  1999 (Prawo ojca) – still photographer, promotional visuals
  1999 (Voyages) – still photographer, promotional visuals
  1998 (Amok) – still photographer, promotional visuals
  1998 (Rider of the Flames) – still photographer, promotional visuals
  1998 (Złoto dezerterów) – still photographer, promotional visuals
  1998 (Brat naszego Boga) – still photographer, promotional visuals
  1998 (Prostytutki) – still photographer, promotional visuals
  1998 (Taekwondo) – still photographer, promotional visuals
  1995 (Cwał) – still photographer, promotional visuals

External links 
 
 Piotr Bujnowicz filmpolski
 Official website
 Official website
 The Aryan Couple – shooting in Poland

References

1976 births
Living people
Łódź Film School alumni
European Film Awards winners (people)
Photographers from Łódź